Paul Tripoli (born December 14, 1961) is a former American football defensive back. He played for the Tampa Bay Buccaneers in 1987.

References

1961 births
Living people
American football defensive backs
Alabama Crimson Tide football players
Tampa Bay Buccaneers players
National Football League replacement players
Liverpool High School alumni